John Wesley "Dick" Summers (1887–1976) was an old-time fiddler from Indiana. He learned to play from his family, but a Tom Riley of Kentucky was also an influence. Summers did not originally read music, but did learn to do so in his 70s. He was one of the only old-time Midwestern fiddlers to have a commercially distributed album in the post-World War II era. As indicated though his style had Southern, and as mentioned Kentucky, influences.

References

Old-time fiddlers
Musicians from Indiana
1887 births
1976 deaths
Place of birth missing
20th-century violinists